ABii National is a Savings and Loans Company in Ghana that provides financial service to the general public.

ABii National was established as a Savings and Loans company, as defined in Ghanaian law, in 2011. In February 2013, the Bank of Ghana granted the company a provisional license as a bank and in September of that year this was converted into a full license. By that time, it had six branches. A seventh branch was opened at Takoradi in  March 2015, by which time the company had nearly 10,000 customers.

Based in Accra, the company is a subsidiary of Tobinco.

References

External links
 

Banks of Ghana
Companies based in Accra
Banks established in 2011
Ghanaian companies established in 2011